Osiek  is a village in the administrative district of Gmina Kostomłoty, within Środa Śląska County, Lower Silesian Voivodeship, in south-western Poland. Prior to 1945 it was in Germany.

The village has an approximate population of 450.

References

External links
 Osiek - Ossig na portalu polska-org.pl  

Villages in Środa Śląska County